The straight-tooth weasel shark, Paragaleus tengi, is a weasel shark of the family Hemigaleidae, found in the tropical western Pacific Ocean. It can reach a length of 88 cm.

Paragaleus tengi is distinctive for its color and size. Specifically, its solid grey dorsal (upper) color, short snout, and 2-3 rows of lower teeth are a few of the characteristic traits that aid in distinguishing between this species of shark and others, like the Paragaleus pectoralis (White & Harris, 2013).

The reproduction of this shark is viviparous.

References

 

Paragaleus
Fish described in 1963